Saint Stefan Uroš V (13362/4 December 1371), known in historiography and folk tradition as Uroš the Weak, was the second Emperor (Tsar) of the Serbian Empire (1355–1371), and before that he was Serbian King and co-ruler (since 1346) with his father, Emperor Stefan Dušan.

Early life
Stefan Uroš V was the only son of Stefan Uroš IV Dušan by Helena of Bulgaria, the sister of Ivan Alexander of Bulgaria. He had been crowned as king (second highest title) in the capacity of heir and co-ruler after Dušan was crowned emperor in 1346. Although by the time of his succession as sole ruler and emperor in 1355 Stefan Uroš V was no longer a minor, he remained heavily dependent on his mother and various members of the court.

Reign
The account of the contemporary John VI Kantakouzenos describes a descent of the Serbian Empire into disintegration soon after death of Uroš' father and his accession. However, Kantakouzenos mainly focused on the Greek lands rather than the Serbian core lands. Further the general disorder long with the powerlessness of the center represents the situation that arose much later in Uroš's reign. According to Mihaljčić, during the initial years of his rule the threats to the territorial integrity of Uroš's empire in the south came mainly from external attacks.
The death of Uroš's father was quickly followed by the death of Preljub, who governed Thessaly. In the spring of 1356, Nikephoros Orsini landed a force on the coast of Thessaly and quickly overran it. He then followed up this success by driving despot Simeon Uroš from Aetolia and Acarnania. Simeon was paternal uncle and the closest male relative of young Emperor Uroš. Retreating to Epirus and western Macedonia, he seized Kostur and proclaimed himself Tsar in hope of becoming co-ruler, or even replacing young Uroš on the Serbian throne. His claim was not widely welcomed, and the support he gained was limited to the some southern regions. The Sabor (state council) held in Skoplje did not accept Simeon's claims and following the endorsement of the magnates, Uroš became more energetic in his political activities, publishing a number of charters. In 1358, Simeon attacked the Skadar region, trying to capture the old Serbia region of Zeta, but was defeated. Defeated in the north, Simeon again turned to south, retaking Epirus and Thessaly in 1359, where he continued to rule with the title "emperor of Serbs and Greeks".

There is one account, early in his reign, that is in contrast to his general record of incompetence. In 1356, Matthew Kantakouzenos, a pretender to the Byzantine throne, gathered an army of 5,000 Turks and marched on Serres, the Serbian-held capital of Jovan Uglješa. Uroš V, whose mother ruled from Serres, decided to raise an army to defend his mother. In 1357, when Matthew and his Turks attacked, the Serbian army under Vojihna of Drama (a major player in that region) came to aid. The Turks were defeated. Matthew Kantakouzenos was captured and held hostage until his ransom was paid by the Byzantine Emperor John V Palaiologos.

In following years, the Serbian Empire gradually fragmented into a conglomeration of principalities, some of which did not even nominally acknowledge Uroš's rule. His position was not helped by his mother Helena, who started to rule autonomously from Serres in alliance with Jovan Uglješa. A similarly autonomous posture was assumed by the Dejanović family, the Balšić family, Nikola Altomanović. By 1365, the most powerful Serbian nobleman became Uglješa's brother Vukašin Mrnjavčević who became co-ruler with Emperor Uroš and was granted the title of Serbian King. By 1369, as Uroš was childless, Vukašin designated his eldest son Prince Marko as heir to the throne, with the title of "young king".

Stefan Uroš V died childless in December 1371, after much of the Serbian nobility had been destroyed by the Turks in the Battle of Maritsa earlier that year. The exact cause of his death at a relatively young age remains unknown. Vukašin's son Prince Marko inherited his father's royal title, but real power in northern Serbia was held by Lazar Hrebeljanović. The latter did not assume the imperial or royal titles (associated with the Nemanjić dynasty), and in 1377 accepted King Tvrtko I of Bosnia (a maternal grandson of Stefan Dragutin) as titular king of Serbia.  Serbia proper became a vassal of the Ottomans in 1390, but remained effectively ruled by the Lazarević family and then by their Branković successors until the fall of Smederevo in 1459.

Following the great conquests of his father, Uroš became a victim of new nobles in a Serbia enriched by recent war and pillaging. The maintaining of order and state instruments was impossible because of weak or nonexistent infrastructure between the old and new territories. The exceptional modesty and tolerance of this ruler was the main reason he was called "the weak", and also the reason he was canonized 211 years after his death.

Stefan Uroš V was canonized by the Serbian Orthodox Church. His body is kept in the Jazak monastery on Fruška Gora mountain.

Legacy

Today, Stefan Uroš V is viewed mostly in contrast to his able and strong-willed father, as a lacking and indecisive ruler, unable to keep the Serbian nobility under his control, whose weak and unassertive personality greatly contributed to the fall of the Empire and the eventual destruction of the Serbian state by the Ottomans. In Serbian folklore and epic poems he is often described as a just, well-intentioned ruler of pleasant appearance but weak character. While this view is popular among historians as well, some argue that he was not especially incompetent in his role as Emperor of Serbia, and that the decline of the empire was much less spectacular and started much later into his rule than popular opinion suggests. For a long time, it was considered a historical fact that he was murdered by his co-ruler, Vukašin Mrnjavčević, but eventually Vukašin was proven to have died before the Emperor.

In 1825 Stefan Stefanović, a Serbian writer living in the Austrian Empire wrote a tragic play called The Death of Uroš V, which drew inspiration from both facts and folk tradition about Uroš, including the aforementioned belief that he was killed by King Vukašin.

See also
 List of Serbian monarchs
 Serbian nobility conflict (1369)
 History of Serbia

References

Sources
 
 
 
 
 
 
 
 
 
 
 
 
 
Translated with small changes from small encyclopedia "Sveznanje" published by "Narodno delo", Belgrade, in 1937 which is today in public domain.

|-

14th-century Serbian emperors
14th-century Serbian monarchs
Eastern Orthodox monarchs
Nemanjić dynasty
1336 births
1371 deaths
Burials at Serbian Orthodox monasteries and churches
Serbian people of Bulgarian descent
Eastern Orthodox royal saints
Serbian saints of the Eastern Orthodox Church
Royal reburials
Sons of emperors